One justice of the North Carolina Supreme Court and six judges of the North Carolina Court of Appeals were elected to eight-year terms by North Carolina voters on November 4, 2008. This coincided with the presidential,  U.S. Senate, U.S. House, gubernatorial, and Council of State elections.

North Carolina judicial elections are non-partisan. Primary elections were held on May 6, 2008 for seats with more than two candidates running. The top two vote-getters in the primary, regardless of party affiliation,  advanced to the general election.

Despite the non-partisan nature of the elections, candidates' party affiliations were well-known. As a result of the elections, the Republicans maintained their 4-3 majority on the state Supreme Court. Democrats maintained their majority on the Court of Appeals. Only one Republican (Robert N. Hunter, Jr.) defeated a Democrat in a Court of Appeals race.

Supreme Court (Edmunds seat)
Incumbent Robert H. Edmunds, Jr. ran for re-election  and was opposed by  Professor Suzanne Reynolds of Wake Forest University Law School.  Edmunds defeated Reynolds in the closest statewide judicial race of 2008.

Court of Appeals (Arrowood seat)
Incumbent John S. Arrowood, appointed in 2007, was opposed by former state Board of Elections chairman Robert N. Hunter, Jr.

Court of Appeals (Stephens seat)
Incumbent Linda Stephens ran for election, having been appointed in 2007. She was opposed by attorney Dan Barrett.

Court of Appeals (Tyson seat)
Incumbent John M. Tyson
was opposed by state District Court Judge Kristin Ruth, former Wake County Clerk of Court Janet Pueschel, and state Utilities Commissioner Sam J. Ervin, IV.

In the May 6 primary, Ervin led the field with 37 percent of the vote, followed by Ruth (26 percent), Tyson (22 percent), and Pueschel (16 percent). Ervin and Ruth advanced to the November general election.

Court of Appeals (McCullough seat)
Incumbent Douglas McCullough was opposed by state District Court Judge Cheri Beasley.

Court of Appeals (Martin seat)
Incumbent John C. Martin, the court's Chief Judge, ran for re-election unopposed.

Court of Appeals (Wynn seat)
Incumbent James A. Wynn was opposed by attorneys Dean R. Poirier and Jewel Ann Farlow in the May 6 primary.

Wynn and Farlow advanced to the November general election. Wynn won approximately 48 percent of the vote in the primary, followed by Farlow (37 percent) and Poirier (15 percent).

References

Judicial
2008